Juan Manuel Esparis (born October 28, 1978) is a field hockey forward from Argentina, who was a member of the Men's National Team that competed at the 2003 Champions Trophy in Amstelveen, Netherlands. He played club hockey for Banco Provincia in Buenos Aires.

References
CA Hockey

1978 births
Living people
Argentine male field hockey players
Place of birth missing (living people)
Pan American Games gold medalists for Argentina
Pan American Games medalists in field hockey
Field hockey players at the 2003 Pan American Games
Medalists at the 2003 Pan American Games